Asmund Bjørken (19 August 1933 – 29 January 2018) was a Norwegian musician who played the accordion and saxophone in the genres of jazz and folk. He was self-taught.

Career
Bjørken was part of Harry Waagens Orchestra, a central band on the Trondheim Jazz scene in 1949–53. He later had his own orchestras in Steinkjer (1956–57) and Trondheim (1957–). In the lineups was among others Karl Holst (clarinet and saxophone, 1957–), Kjell Johansen (drums, 1957–) and Bjørn Alterhaug (bass, 1966–). I. 1990 the orchestra consisted of Oddmund Finnseth, Ove Bjørken (guitar), Per Olaf Green and Rolf Skogstad. 
Av utenlandske samarbeid kan nevnes Bengt Hallberg, Benny Bailey, Mads Vinding.

In the 1980s he played in Egil Kapstad/Rowland Greenberg Quartet, and since 1990 he has led own Asmund Bjørken Swing Sextet, which inter alia 
Ove Bjørken, Bjørn Alterhaug and Bjørn Krokfoss are included, as well as Erling Aksdal (piano).

He released the autobiography Spellemann, på gammel rutine og støgg mistanke in 2003, and a portrait of him vas put up at the Norwegian television channel NRK in 2003, called Asmund i Himmelriket, by Andreas Lunnan.

Honors
1972: Buddyprisen 
1998: Nord-Trøndelag fylkes kulturpris
2002: Vågåfatet
2003: Verdal kommunes kulturpris
2004: Trondheim Jazz Festival honorary Award

Discography

Solo albums
1976: Accordeon to my heart
1990: Gammeldansens Perler, within 'Asmund Bjørkens Orchestra (Sonor Records)
1992: Pot's on, within Asmund Bjørkens Sextet
1997: Jazz Accordion – My way, (Sonor Records)

Collaborative works
1979:  Frösöminner, (ARC)
1981: Old news, within Bjørn Krokfoss Oktet
1982: All the things you are, with Arvid Genius

References

External links
Asmund Bjørken Biography on JazzBasen.no

1933 births
2018 deaths
Norwegian writers
Norwegian jazz saxophonists
Norwegian jazz accordionists
Norwegian jazz composers
Musicians from Verdal
20th-century saxophonists